Javad Manafi (born September 23, 1970) is an Iranian retired association footballer and coach. He has represented Iran national football team 8 times, scoring twice.

In 1994, he was badly injured in a car accident, forcing him to retire at age 24.

References 

 jamejamonline.ir
 navad.net
 perspolis-club.com
 aftabir.com

1970 births
Living people
Iran international footballers
Iranian footballers
Persepolis F.C. players
Persepolis F.C. non-playing staff
Iranian football managers
Mazandarani people
People from Behshahr
Association football fullbacks
Footballers at the 1994 Asian Games
Asian Games competitors for Iran
Sportspeople from Mazandaran province